Windegg ("windy ridge") is a frequent Swiss toponym, among other instances referring to:
the County of Windegg (now part of the Swiss canton of St. Gallen)
Windegg, Aeschi bei Spiez
Windegg, Amden
Windegg, Arosa
Windegg, Bad Ragaz
Windegg, Bauma
Windegg, Bönigen
Windegg, Chur
Windegg, Dallenwil
Windegg, Einsiedeln
Windegg, Eschlikon
Windegg, Freienbach
Alp Windegg, Gersau
Windegg, Glarus Süd
Windegg, Gonten
Windegg, Gossau SG
Windegg, Grindelwald
Windegg, Guttannen
Windegg, Hergiswil
Windegg, Herisau
Windegg, Herrliberg
Windegg, Illgau
Windegg, Innertkirchen
Windegg, Jonschwil
Windegg, Küssnacht
Windegg, Langnau am Albis
Windegg, Lauerz
Windegg, Lichtensteig
Windegg, Maienfeld
Windegg, Mels
Windegg, Muotathal
Windegg, Nesslau
Windegg, Oberiberg
Windegg, Pfäfers
Windegg, Rapperswil-Jona
Windegg, Schaffhausen
Windegg Castle, Schänis
Windegg, Schiers
Windegg, Schwende District
Windegg, Sevelen
Windegg, Silenen
Windegg, St. Margrethen
Windegg, Unterägeri
Windegg, Urnäsch
Alp Windegg, Vilters-Wangs
Windegg, Vitznau
Windegg, Vorderthal
Herrensitz Windegg in Wald ZH
Windegg, Wattwil
Windegg, Wildhaus-Alt St. Johann
Windegg, Wittenbach
Windegg, Wolfenschiessen

See also
 Wind egg (disambiguation)